

List of Ambassadors

Isi Yanouka incumbent 
Ran Gidor 2016 - 
Nadav Cohen 2013 - 2016
Michael Arbel 2009 - 2013
Avraham Nir 2007 - 2009
Benny Omer 2003 - 2007
Yoram Elron 2000 - 2003
Tova Levy-Furman 1998 - 2000
Yaacov Keinan 1988 - 1992
Gadi Golan 1986 - 1988
Haim Yaary 1971 - 1973
Shlomo Havilio 1964 - 1969
Elhanan Gafni 1962 - 1964

References 

Cameroon
Israel